Poltergeist is a 2015 American supernatural horror film directed by Gil Kenan, written by David Lindsay-Abaire, and produced by Sam Raimi, Rob Tapert, and Roy Lee. It is a remake of the 1982 film of the same name and is the fourth installment overall in the Poltergeist franchise. The film stars Sam Rockwell, Rosemarie DeWitt, Jared Harris, and Jane Adams, and follows a family who arrive at their new home and begin experiencing paranormal occurrences.

The project was announced in 2008 with Vadim Perelman initially directing the project from a screenplay written by Juliet Snowden and Stiles White. It was delayed several times and entered into development hell. By 2012, a remake of the 1982 film was announced with Raimi producing the project alongside Lee, Tapert, and Nathan Kahane. Kenan was announced as the film's director in 2013 and principal photography took place in Toronto from September to December that same year.

Poltergeist was theatrically released on May 22, 2015, by 20th Century Fox. It received mixed reviews from critics for its excessive jump scares and was deemed inferior to the original. It had moderate box office success, grossing over $95 million worldwide against a budget of $35 million.

Plot 
Eric and Amy Bowen are a married couple looking to buy a house for themselves and their three children: 16-year-old daughter Kendra, 9-year-old son Griffin and 6-year-old daughter Madison. Eric was recently laid off, but they are shown a house that has recently come on the market that fits their price range, they purchase it and move in.

The first night, they hear strange noises in the walls and Griffin finds a box containing clown dolls that were left at the house. In the middle of the night, lights and electronic devices start turning on and off, as an unseen force appears to move through the home. The commotion wakes Griffin, and he goes downstairs and finds Maddie talking to an unknown presence inside the television. She tells Griffin someone is coming, and he attempts to unplug the TV, causing the lights to go out of control. Maddie then tells the family "They're here" while touching their TV screen.

The following evening, Eric and Amy go to dinner with their friends, leaving the three children at home. They learn that their house was built on an old cemetery, although the property developer was supposed to have relocated the human remains. Kendra wakes up to a strange sound in the laundry room. While investigating the noise, the floor cracks and a corpse's hand emerges. It begins pulling at her foot, but she manages to pull herself up. Meanwhile, Griffin notices the clown dolls seem to be moving by themselves. One clown doll attacks him, but he destroys it with his foot and runs from his bedroom. He finds Maddie in her room, scared, crouching in a corner, and tells her to stay while he goes to find Kendra. Maddie is then lured by the light from her lamp and her favorite toy into her closet, becoming lost in an unending void. As she turns to see her bedroom drifting away further, she is dragged into the darkness by ghosts. Griffin is grabbed through a window by the branches of the old tree outside their house, which pulls him outside. Amy and Eric arrive home to see Griffin being tossed around in the tree branches, which releases its grip when they come close, while Kendra hysterically tells them she cannot find Maddie.

The family hears Maddie's voice emanating from the television. Amy places her hand on the television screen while Maddie's static hand is seen to be touching Amy's hand from the other side of the screen. Amy and Griffin visit the Paranormal Research department for help. The staff set up equipment in the house and install GPS devices on everyone in the house. During the setup, Boyd has a near-death experience in drilling a hole in the wall, yanked in by spirits by his arm. While trying to contact Maddie, Eric is ambushed in the closet by a ghost resembling her. Angered, he breaks down the closet wall, throwing a section of a broken table into the darkness inside the closet; the table segment falls back into the living room (nearly crushing Griffin), revealing a potential portal for Maddie to escape through. The investigators deduce and confirm that the haunting is caused by a poltergeist. The lead investigator, Dr. Brooke Powell, decides to call occult specialist and television personality Carrigan Burke (revealed, much later, to be Powell's ex).

Carrigan explains that Maddie is a possible psychic, able to communicate with spirits. He reveals that the ghosts are trapped and are angry because only the headstones were moved to the new cemetery, but the bodies remain; they plan on using Maddie "to free them from their purgatory". Carrigan comes up with a plan to get Maddie back. He anchors a rope in Maddie's room and tosses it into the vortex. They attempt to use Griffin's toy drone to guide Maddie out, but it is immediately destroyed by the ghosts when inside the portal. Griffin, guilt-ridden over leaving Maddie alone in the first place, goes through the portal himself. When he finds Maddie, the ghosts attempt to destroy the rope to trap them, but Griffin and Maddie grab onto the rope and fall back through the portal into the house. Both children are unconscious and covered in grey matter, to which Carrigan instructs for them to be washed and they awake.

The family get in their car and begin to leave the house, but the ghosts drag them back into the house and attempt to abduct Maddie again, flipping the car in the process. Maddie is seen being abducted up the stairs. The family saves her from being sucked into the portal, and Carrigan decides that as the only other psychic, he must go into the vortex and lead the spirits into the light. Kendra stamps and destroys the television screen as ghosts' hands are seen, trying to communicate with Maddie. The Bowens flee the neighbourhood as the house is destroyed by the spirits soaring into the sky as a beacon of light. The investigative team run to their equipment, looking for a sign that Carrigan managed to get back.

As the Bowens look for a new house, the realtor shows them a house with much closet space and an old tree in the backyard but the Bowens drive away laughing. During the end credits, it is revealed that Carrigan survived the incident and is back filming his ghost program, now hosting the show with Dr. Powell.

Cast 
 Sam Rockwell as Eric Bowen
 Rosemarie DeWitt as Amy Bowen
 Saxon Sharbino as Kendra Bowen
 Kyle Catlett as Griffin "Griff" Bowen
 Kennedi Clements as Madison "Maddy" Bowen
 Jared Harris as Carrigan Burke
 Jane Adams as Dr. Brooke Powell
 Nicholas Braun as Boyd
 Susan Heyward as Sophie
 Soma Bhatia as Lauren
 Karen Ivany as Mrs. Stroller

Production

Development 
During the 1990s, Universal Studios briefly toyed with the idea of making a prequel film for the character of Reverend Kane. In 2003, Metro-Goldwyn-Mayer Pictures began development on a fourth installment of the Poltergeist series. Under the title Poltergeist: Kayeri, Clint Morris was tapped to pen the script, which would have ignored the events of Poltergeist III. Craig T. Nelson and JoBeth Williams were courted to reprise their roles, while the part of Carol Anne was to be recast due to the passing of Heather O'Rourke in 1988. In November 2005, Nelson was officially on board and Hilary Duff was reportedly in the running for Carol. By November 2006, rumors emerged that the studio was intending to "retool" Kayeri as a remake of the first film "frame for frame". However, these reports were dispatched shortly after. In 2007, the studio decided to move in a new direction for the sequel and turned to Michael Grais to write a new script, now titled Poltergeist: In The Shadows.

Development on In the Shadows quickly stalled out as well. In August 2008, the studio officially moved forward with a remake of the original film.Juliet Snowden and Stiles White of Boogeyman were hired as screenwriters. The next month, Vadim Perelman began talks to direct the film. The studio slotted a release date of November 24, 2010. Production was to commence in early 2010. The film's tight deadline, as well as MGM's financial issues, would delay the film to an unspecified date in 2011.

In April 2012, The Hollywood Reporter announced that Sam Raimi, Nathan Kahane, Roy Lee, and Robert Tapert would produce. Raimi helped oversee the search for a helmer. David Lindsay-Abaire, who worked on Raimi's Oz: The Great and Powerful, was to write a new screenplay. That August, Raimi affirmed the film was still on track. By October, conflicting reports materialized that Raimi would direct the film after Lindsey-Abaire misspoke in an interview. In March 2013, Gil Kenan of Monster House was hired to direct the film while Roy Lee would join Raimi and Tapert as producers.<ref>{{cite web|last=Fleming|first=Mike Jr.|url=https://deadline.com/2013/03/monster-houses-gil-kenan-finds-new-haunt-hell-helm-mgm-poltergeist-remake-447405/|title=Monster House'''s Gil Kenan Finds New Haunt: He'll Helm MGM Poltergeist Remake|date=March 6, 2013|website=Deadline|accessdate=December 30, 2022}}</ref> Come June, 20th Century Fox boarded the film to co-produce and distribute the film. Production was gearing up to begin that fall.

 Casting 
In September 2013, Sam Rockwell, Rosemarie DeWitt, Jared Harris and Jane Adams were cast in the film. Tom Cruise and Richard Armitage were considered for the role of Eric Bowen. Saxon Sharbino, Kyle Catlett and Kennedi Clements were cast in the film.

 Filming 
Principal photography began on September 23 and ended on December 13, 2013. The crew shot interior scenes for the film in an old residence in Toronto. Exterior shots were filmed on the West Mountain of Hamilton.

 Release 
On August 6, 2014, the film's release date was shifted from February 13, 2015 to July 24, 2015. On March 4, 2015, the date was shifted again to when it was previously set for release alongside Spy. It was released in 3D.

 Marketing 
The film's first trailer was released on February 5, 2015. Forrest Wickman of Slate Magazines opinion was that the trailer made the film appear to be too similar to the original film. James Hibberd of Entertainment Weekly said that the trailer "retains and amplifies several elements from the original", and praised that "the modernizing doesn’t result in, say, the family’s daughter being kidnapped by ghosts in Snapchat". Brad Miska of Bloody Disgusting stated that "while every fiber of my being wants to reject it, [the film] actually looks pretty insane", and praised the trailer's final shot. Ben Kuchera of Polygon also opined that the trailer appeared to be similar to the original film, but that it "looks great, as a horror movie".

 Home media Poltergeist was released on DVD, Blu-ray Disc and Blu-ray 3D on September 29, 2015. The Blu-ray editions included an extended cut of the film.

 Reception 
 Box office Poltergeist grossed $47.4 million in North America and $48.2 million in other territories for a worldwide total of $95.6 million against a budget of an estimated $35 million.

In North America, Poltergeist made $1.4 million during its Thursday night showings from 2,500 theaters, and an estimated $9.4 million on its opening day. Through its first three-day opening, it grossed $22.6 million from 3,240 theaters, debuting at fourth place at the box office behind Tomorrowland, Pitch Perfect 2 and Mad Max: Fury Road. In comparison to prior horror film reboots, its opening is well below the openings of 2009's Friday the 13th ($40.57 million), 2010's A Nightmare on Elm Street ($32.9 million), 2003's The Texas Chainsaw Massacre ($28.1 million), and right below 2005's The Amityville Horror ($23.5 million).

Outside North America, it earned $8.3 million on its opening weekend from 3,750 screens in 36 countries, finishing at sixth place at the international box office. In the UK, Ireland and Malta it opened in third place with $2.2 million and Brazil with $2 million.

 Critical response 
On Rotten Tomatoes, the film has a rating of 29% based on 137 reviews and an average rating of 4.81/10. The site's consensus reads: "Paying competent homage without adding anything of real value to the original Poltergeist, this remake proves just as ephemeral (but half as haunting) as its titular spirit." On Metacritic, the film has a score of 47 out of 100 based on 27 critics, indicating "mixed or average reviews". Audiences polled by CinemaScore gave the film an average grade of "C+" on an A+ to F scale.

Writing for Variety, Andrew Barker called it "generally entertaining yet fundamentally unnecessary" and concluded: "Even when one is inclined to admire the cleverness with which the remake revisits and reincorporates Poltergeists themes, it’s hard to pinpoint a single moment where it improves on them, and the aura of inessentiality hangs thick over the proceedings". Neil Genzlinger gave the film a mostly positive review in The New York Times, writing: "The new Poltergeist might well be the scariest movie 13-or-unders have yet seen, just as the original was for their parents back in 1982. Those parents might find it an enjoyable trip down memory lane, even if they do now recognize it as largely a well-served collection of horror-movie tropes". Eddie Goldberger echoed that sentiment in The New York Daily News, writing "It doesn't approach the original--really, how could it? But the new Poltergeist is a fun, worthy horror entry." Tirdad Derakhshani wrote in The Philadelphia Inquirer: "It's not exactly a scary film, but it does provide an enjoyable ride. It's good fun. But it left me befuddled", adding: "Why would anyone want to remake Poltergeist in the first place?". Writing in The Daily Telegraph, Mike McCahill called the film "an efficient scare-machine". Bilge Ebiri wrote in New York magazine: "This new Poltergeist isn't anything special... But it's not a travesty, and that feels like cause for brief celebration".

Other critics took a more skeptical view of the film. Writing a review for The Village Voice, Alan Scherstuhl stated, "Poltergeist 2015 is to Poltergeist '82 what today's shipped-frozen-to-the-store Pizza Hut dough is to the kneaded-on-site pies the chain's stoned cooks tossed in the Reagan era. It's the same kind of thing, with the same shape and some shared ingredients, but the texture's gone limp, and there's no sense of occasion about it, and there's some unpalatable goop stuffed in the crust. In a pinch, it beats pizzalessness — but just barely." Linda Cook wrote in The Quad City Times, "The Poltergeist remake is OK, but won't stay with you." Randy Cordova in The Arizona Republic'' wrote, "Ultimately, the whole affair is forgettable."

Future
In April 2019, it was announced that the Russo Brothers would helm a new reboot of the franchise.

References

External links 

 
 
  
 
 
 

Poltergeist (franchise)
2015 3D films
2015 horror films
2010s ghost films
20th Century Fox films
American 3D films
American supernatural horror films
Remakes of American films
Films directed by Gil Kenan
Films produced by Roy Lee
Films produced by Sam Raimi
Films scored by Marc Streitenfeld
Films shot in Toronto
Films with screenplays by David Lindsay-Abaire
American ghost films
American haunted house films
Horror film remakes
Horror films about clowns
Metro-Goldwyn-Mayer films
Ghost House Pictures films
Reboot films
Vertigo Entertainment films
2010s English-language films
2010s American films